The Trial of Lunatics Act 1883 is an Act of the Parliament of the United Kingdom, allowing the jury to return a verdict that the defendant was guilty, but insane at the time, and should be kept in custody as a "criminal lunatic". This Act was passed at the request of Queen Victoria, who, the target of frequent attacks by mentally ill individuals, demanded that the verdict be changed from "not guilty" so as to act as a deterrent to other lunatics; the phrasing of "guilty of the act or omission charged, but insane so as not to be responsible, according to law, for his actions" remained in use until the Criminal Procedure (Insanity) Act 1964.

It was cited in 1991 in the case of R v Burgess regarding the automatism defence.

The form of special verdict provided for by this Act was commonly known as guilty but insane. This expression was not an accurate description of that verdict.

See also 
 Criminal Lunatics Act 1800
 Insanity in English law

References

External links 
 Text of the Trial of Lunatics Act 1883

English criminal law
United Kingdom Acts of Parliament 1883
1883 in British law
Mental health legal history of the United Kingdom